The Communauté de communes des Hautes Vosges is an administrative association of rural communes in the Vosges department of eastern France. It was created on 1 January 2017 by the merger of the former Communauté de communes de Gérardmer-Monts et Vallées, Communauté de communes de la Haute Moselotte and Communauté de communes Terre de Granite. On 1 January 2022 8 communes separated from the Communauté de communes des Hautes Vosges to form the new Communauté de communes Gérardmer Hautes Vosges. It consists of 14 communes, and has its administrative offices at Cornimont. Its area is 305.2 km2, and its population was 21,195 in 2019 (geography as of January 2022).

Composition 
The association comprises 14 communes:

Basse-sur-le-Rupt
La Bresse
Cleurie
Cornimont
La Forge
Gerbamont
Rochesson
Sapois
Saulxures-sur-Moselotte
Le Syndicat
Tendon
Thiéfosse
Vagney
Ventron

References

Commune communities in France
Intercommunalities of Vosges